Alyson Leigh Rosenfeld (born March 21, 1987) is an American stage and voice actress, best known for voicing Bonnie, Nurse Joy, and Sophocles in the Pokémon anime and Rio on Yu-Gi-Oh! Zexal.

Early life 
Alyson Leigh Rosenfeld was born to a Jewish family on March 21, 1987 in New York City. She also has Latina heritage. She graduated from New York University.

Career

Anime 

As of 2010, Rosenfeld was voicing many characters in Pokemon, like this minor character too.

In August 2019, Rossnfeld was cast in the role of Aina Arbeit in the English dub of the anime film Promare.

Theatre 
Rosenfeld played Manicka in The Last Cyclist, an absurdist comedy about the Holocaust, between May 30 and June 9, 2013, at the West End Theatre.

Between March 7 and 29, 2015, Rosenfeld starred as the titular role in Stephen Schwartz's first professional NYC production of The Baker's Wife at The Gallery Players.

Rosenfeld starred as Gertrude in Lynn Ahrens & Stephen Flaherty's Seussical at The Gallery Players from January 29 until February 21, 2016.

Between January 28 and February 19, 2017, Rosenfeld starred in Stephen Sondheim's Marry Me a Little and as Lucy in You're A Good Man, Charlie Brown. Both shows were performed in rep.

Between January 27 and February 18, 2018, Rosenfeld performed in William Finn's A New Brain as Rhoda.

Rosenfeld starred as Princess Winnifred in Mary Rodgers' Once Upon a Mattress between February 22 and March 17, 2019.

Personal life 

On October 20, 2017, Rosenfeld married fellow voice actor James Weaver Clark. They had first met at New York University.

In October 2019, Rosenfeld announced that she was expecting her first child, and on April 28, 2020, she announced the birth of a boy.

Credits

Film

Television

Video games

Web series

References

External links 
 
 
 
 

1987 births
Living people
Actresses from New York City
American film actresses
American stage actresses
American television actresses
American voice actresses
Place of birth missing (living people)
Tisch School of the Arts alumni
21st-century American actresses